Shlomo Simcha Sufrin, better known as Shlomo Simcha (Hebrew: שלמה שמחה) is a UK-born Canadian Hasidic Jewish cantor and singer. Shlomo Simcha began his career in a small kollel in Montreal, where he was discovered by a local wedding band leader who brought him onto a project recording a series for children in the Satmar community called Besof Umachol. His work on the series caught the attention of Mendy Werdyger at Aderet Records, who introduced him to artist Sheya Mendlowitz, with whom he would create his first commercial album.

In 1992, Shlomo Simcha found himself flying to Israel to perform on stage with Mordechai Ben David at a concert in Yad Eliyahu, Tel Aviv during the holiday of Sukkot – his first major exposure to audiences and other names in the world of Jewish music. That exposure led to the first of many invitations to perform at the annual A Time for Music benefit concert, in support of the Jewish non-profit agency HASC, and the beginning of his relationship with composer and musical artist Abie Rotenberg, with whom he would create the popular Aish music series.

Since the start of his career, Shlomo Simcha has released seven solo albums and collaborated or been featured on over 20 albums, with artists and composers like Benny Friedman, Nafshenu Orchestra, Yossi Green and more. He regularly performs at benefit concerts and Jewish community events across North America, the UK and Israel, as well as private and corporate functions.

Personal life 
Shlomo Simcha was born in Manchester, United Kingdom, to Rabbi Mordechai Tzvi and Mrs. Frayda Sufrin. He is a great-grandchild of Rabbi Eliyahu Lopian, and one of 14 children. He grew up in the Hampstead Garden Suburb and Temple Fortune neighbourhoods of London where he was influenced by the prayer styles of his own father, as well as Nathan (Bobby) Vogel, and Cantor Herschel Gorman.

Following his family's move to Temple Fortune, Shlomo Simcha became obsessed with professional singing, and sought to join the London School of Jewish Song (a London-based Jewish choir led by composer and musical artist Yigal Calek). While he has said his family would not be able to manage the time commitment necessary for Shlomo to be in the choir, he was allowed to sit in on rehearsals, and he made a point to seat himself at the same table as Yigal Calek at their synagogue's Friday evening services every week.

Career 
In 1989, Shlomo Simcha entered his first professional position as Sexton and Assistant Cantor at the Tifereth Beth David Jerusalem Synagogue in Cote St Luc, Montreal. He remained there until 1993, when he moved to Toronto, Ontario after receiving an offer for the position of Lead Cantor from Shaarei Shomayim Congregation, working alongside Cantor Yaakov Motzen. Shlomo retained that position until 2005, after which he became the Cantor at the Torath Emeth Congregation, a role he held until 2019. During and beyond his time as a cantor, Shlomo Simcha worked to build up his career as a solo and collaborative artist, beginning with his 1993 debut album, That Special Melody, under Aderet Records.

While Shlomo Simcha's career as a solo artist officially began with the release of his first album in 1993, his first experience in studio was singing on the Besof Umachol series for the Satmar community in 1990, recorded at the home studio of the head of the Montreal wedding band. In 1992, Mendy Werdyger of Aderet Records heard the tape while in a store in Williamsburg, Brooklyn and contacted Shlomo Simcha directly to inquire about making an album. During his initial meeting at Aderet in New York, Werdyger introduced Shlomo Simcha to Sheya Mendlowitz, producer of the HASC: A Time for Music series, and informed him that they wanted to record a series of albums together. Soon after, Werdyger's brother, singer Mordechai Ben David, invited Shlomo Simcha to travel with him to Israel to perform at a concert for the holiday of Sukkot, and the two performed together on stage, introducing Shlomo Simcha to Ben David's fan base.

Not long after, Shlomo Simcha would receive the first of what would be many invitations to perform at the annual HASC: A Time for Music benefit concert, where he would eventually meet long-time friend and collaborator Abie Rotenberg, with whom he would go on to create the Aish series. Since the beginning of his career as a recording artist, between solo, collaborative and featured work, Shlomo Simcha has sung on over 40 full-length albums.

Shlomo Simcha moved from Toronto to Boca Raton, Florida in 2021.

Discography

Solo albums

Aish series

Collaborations and featured

References

External links 
Official Website

1967 births
Living people
British Orthodox Jews
British people of Polish-Jewish descent
Hasidic entertainers
Hasidic singers
Jewish singers
People from the London Borough of Barnet
Canadian Hasidim
Canadian people of Polish-Jewish descent
Hazzans